Girolamo Bevilacqua O.F.M. (died 1604) was a Roman Catholic prelate who served as Archbishop of Nazareth (1587–1604).

Biography
Girolamo Bevilacqua was born in Spello, Italy and ordained a priest in the Order of Friars Minor. 
On 2 December 1587, he was appointed during the papacy of Pope Sixtus V as Archbishop of Nazareth.
On 27 Dec 1587, he was consecrated bishop by Costanzo de Sarnano, Bishop of Vercelli.
He served as Archbishop of Nazareth until his death on 4 September 1604.

While bishop, he was the principal co-consecrator of Fabio Biondi, Titular Patriarch of Jerusalem (1588); and Thomas Cammerota, Bishop of Vieste (1589).

See also 
Catholic Church in Italy

References

External links and additional sources
 (for Chronology of Bishops) 
 (for Chronology of Bishops)  

16th-century Roman Catholic titular bishops
17th-century Roman Catholic titular bishops
Bishops appointed by Pope Sixtus V
1604 deaths